"Wild 2nite" is a song by Jamaican rapper Shaggy, featuring singer Olivia. The song was released on September 5, 2005, as the lead single from Shaggy's sixth studio album, Clothes Drop (2005). It was written by songwriters Orville Burrell, Ricardo Ducent, Huey Dunbar, Robert Lyn, and Robert Shakespeare and produced by Shaggy. "Wild 2nite" peaked at #61 on the UK Singles Chart.

Track listing
 UK CD1
 "Wild 2nite" (featuring Olivia) - 3:20
 "Ready fi di Ride" - 3:34

 UK CD2
 "Wild 2nite" (featuring Olivia) - 3:20
 "Wild 2nite" (Birch Mix) - 3:24
 "Wild 2nite" (MK's Wild West Remix) - 3:19
 "Ready fi di Ride" - 3:34
 "Wild 2nite" (Video) - 3:20
 "Ready fi di Ride" (Video) - 3:34

Charts

References

2005 singles
2005 songs
Shaggy (musician) songs
Olivia (singer) songs
Music videos directed by Director X
Songs written by Shaggy (musician)